Prajnanam Brahma is a Mahāvākya, which is found in Aitareya Upanishad of the Rigveda. The other Mahāvākyas are "Aham Brahman Asmi", "Tat Tvam Asi" and "Ayam Atma Brahma".

Etymology and meaning
The Sanskrit word Prajna means "Jñāna or Chaitanya (consciousness)",  and spontaneous concept. Brahman is the Absolute, Consciousness, Infinite and "Supreme Truth". Especially "Brahman is Jñāna"; "The ultimate reality is Prajna". "Prajnanam Brahma" means "Brahma-Chaitanya" or "Brahma-Jñāna".

Source and significance
The Mahāvākya is found in the Aitareya Upanishad of Rigveda. It is mentioned in Aitareya Upanishad 3.3,

The third chapter of the Aitareya Upanishad discusses the nature of the Ātman. It declares that Chaitanya (consciousness) is what defines man, the source of all intellectual and moral theory, of all gods, of all living beings, whatever. The Upanishad then claim that the key to the puzzle of the universe is its own underlying. To know the universe, know yourself. Become immortal as you are, Aitareya Upanishad advises.

According to Sahu,

According to David Loy,

Notes

References

Sources

Printed sources

Web-sources

External links
Aitareya Aranyaka with Aitareya Upanishad embedded inside Max Muller. The Sacred Books of the East, Oxford University Press
Aitareya Upanishad Another archive of Nikhilānanda translation
Aitareya. Sri Aurobindo Ashram, Pondicherry. 1972.
 Aiteraya Upanishad Sanskrit Text, sanskritdocuments.org
 The four MahaVakyas of the Upanishads that can change your perspective about God !
 Outlines of Vedanta: Prajnanam Brahma Aham Brahmasmi Tattvamasi Ayamatma Brahma

Hindu philosophical concepts
Advaita Vedanta